Francis Engle Patterson (March 7, 1821 – November 22, 1862) was a United States Army general who served during the American Civil War.

Life and career
Patterson was born in Philadelphia to Irish-American army officer Robert Patterson, himself a general during the Mexican–American War and the Civil War, and Sarah Engle. His brother was brevet Brig. Gen. Robert Emmet Patterson, and he was brother-in-law to another Union general, John Joseph Abercrombie. Like his father, he entered the army during the Mexican-American War, and was commissioned a second lieutenant in the 1st U.S. Artillery (June 24, 1847  October 28, 1847). He was promoted to first lieutenant October 29, 1847. After the war, Patterson transferred to the 9th U.S. Infantry where he was promoted to captain, March 3, 1855; he resigned May 1, 1857.

At the outbreak of the Civil War, Patterson rejoined the army and was commissioned colonel of the 17th Pennsylvania Volunteer Infantry, April 25, 1861. He was promoted to brigadier general in the United States Volunteers on April 11, 1862, and placed in command of the 3rd Brigade, 2nd Division, III Corps, Army of the Potomac.

Patterson led his brigade at Williamsburg and Seven Pines, but during the latter battle, he had to relinquish command due to illness, apparently typhoid fever. He took a leave of absence on June 7 and so missed the Seven Days Battles entirely. By July, he was well enough to take on administrative duties at army headquarters. Patterson did not return to field command until the fall months when he resumed command of his old brigade, now in Daniel Sickles's division. However, recurrent ill health continued to plague him.

Patterson was at Catlett's Station when he withdrew his brigade upon hearing unconfirmed reports of a Confederate troop presence nearby. Sickles accused him of retreating without orders and called for a military board of inquiry to court-martial him. However, on November 2, Patterson was found dead in his tent of a self-inflicted gunshot wound. Initially it was not clear whether his death was accidental or a suicide.  But an article in The Baltimore Sun from 29 November 1862 cites an eyewitness, Capt. Vreeland of the 8th New Jersey Volunteer Infantry who was with him in his tent at the time.  Vreeland states that Patterson "committed the act while under a temporary insanity ... so suddenly was the rash act committed that (I) could not stay his hand."

Patterson is buried at Laurel Hill Cemetery in Philadelphia, Pennsylvania. His father and brother were later buried next to him.

See also

 List of American Civil War generals (Union)

Notes

References
 

1821 births
1862 deaths
American military personnel of the Mexican–American War
American people of Irish descent
Burials at Laurel Hill Cemetery (Philadelphia)
Military personnel from Philadelphia
People of Pennsylvania in the American Civil War
Suicides by firearm in Virginia
Union Army generals
United States Army officers
1860s suicides